Zakiya Summers (born January 14, 1983) is an American politician and former journalist serving as a member of the Mississippi House of Representatives from the 68th district. She assumed office on January 7, 2020.

Early life and education 
Summers was born on January 14, 1983, in Houston, Texas. She earned a Bachelor of Arts degree in journalism from the Missouri School of Journalism in 2005.

Career 
Summers moved to Mississippi to work as a producer for WLBT TV.  She later worked as a public relations manager for the Jackson Medical Mall Foundation.  Since 2015, she has worked as the director of communications and advocacy at the ACLU of Mississippi.

Summers was elected to the Mississippi House of Representatives and assumed office on January 7, 2020.

References 

Living people
1983 births
People from Houston
Democratic Party members of the Mississippi House of Representatives
Missouri School of Journalism alumni
University of Missouri alumni
African-American state legislators in Mississippi
21st-century American politicians
21st-century American women politicians
21st-century African-American women
21st-century African-American politicians